Roger Protz (born 5 February 1939) is a British writer, journalist and campaigner. He joined the Campaign for Real Ale (CAMRA) in 1976 and has written several books on beer and pubs. He edited the 1978 to 1983 editions of CAMRA's Good Beer Guide and each edition since 2000. He announced in autumn 2017 that the 2018 Guide would be his last.

Biography
Protz was born in London to a respectable working-class family. His father was a dockworker. During the Blitz he was evacuated with his mother to Norfolk. He grew up in the East End of London and left school aged 16.

Protz joined the Labour Party Young Socialists and became editor of its newspaper, New Advance.  While in the Labour Party, he joined the Socialist Labour League. In the 1960s, he also worked as a sub-editor on the features desk at the Evening Standard.  In 1961, he resigned from New Advance to become the editor of the SLL's youth newspaper Keep Left. In 1964, he became editor of the Militant newspaper, and in 1968 of Socialist Worker, resigning in 1974. Subsequently, he spent a period lecturing part-time in journalism at the London College of Printing. Following a national economic crisis he lost his job.

Protz was subsequently hired by CAMRA in 1976 to edit its monthly magazine. He edited The Good Beer Guide from the 1978 edition onwards.

He writes a regular column for the Publican's Morning Advertiser, a monthly column for What's Brewing and also contributes to Beers of the World and All About Beer. He also wrote a beer column for The Guardian until 2006. In 2007, he lectured on the history of beer to the Smithsonian Institution in Washington DC. In 1988 he founded the British Guild of Beer Writers and was chairman of the Guild 2000–2003. His awards include two golden and five silver tankards from the Guild and he was named Glenfiddich Drink Writer of the Year in 1997 and 2004.

In a 2010 interview he described himself as a "green socialist" and a supporter of West Ham United F.C.

He was interviewed by Sheila Dillon for a 30-minute long BBC Radio 4 The Food Programme on 15 August 2016, aptly named "Roger Protz: A Life Through Beer".

Protz edited the Campaign for Real Ale's Good Beer Guide from 1978 to 1983 and from 2000. He announced in autumn 2017 that the 2018 Guide was to be his last.

Publications
Britain's 500 Best Pubs. London: Carlton Books, 2000 .
 The Complete Guide to World Beer, 2004. .
 Classic Stout and Porter, 1997. .
 The Ultimate Encyclopedia of Beer, 1995. .
 300 Beers to Try Before You Die, 2005. .
 300 More Beers to Try Before You Die, 2013. .
 The Family Brewers of Britain: A celebration of British brewing heritage. 2020. .
 The Ale Trail: A celebration of the revival of the world's oldest beer style. 1995. .

References

External links
Roger Protz beer

1939 births
Living people
Beer writers
British male journalists
British Trotskyists
Militant tendency supporters
Socialist Workers Party (UK) members
Workers Revolutionary Party (UK) members
British socialists